Jane Elizabeth Goulding (born 18 October 1957 in Te Kōpuru to Nionne and John Goulding) is a retired field hockey player from New Zealand, who was a member of the national team that finished sixth at the 1984 Summer Olympics in Los Angeles, California.

References
 New Zealand Olympic Committee

External links
 

New Zealand female field hockey players
Olympic field hockey players of New Zealand
Field hockey players at the 1984 Summer Olympics
1957 births
Living people
People from Te Kōpuru
20th-century New Zealand women